Enna Solla Pogirai is a 2022 Indian Tamil-language romantic comedy film written and directed by A. Hariharan. The film stars Ashwin Kumar Lakshmikanthan, Teju Ashwini and Avantika Mishra, with Pugazh, Delhi Ganesh, Subbu Panchu and Swaminathan in supporting roles. It was released on 13 January 2022.

Plot 

RJ Vikram, who is engaged to Anjali, soon learns about her wish to marry a man who was once in a serious relationship. Having never been in love before, Vikram proceeds to tell Anjali a false story about his first and only love. Having heard the story, Anjali wishes to meet his ex to understand her side of the story. To fulfill it, he asks Preethi, an actress, to act as his ex-girlfriend. His plan backfires soon as he finds himself in a love triangle as he falls in love with Preethi. He and Preethi reunite and Anjali writes a book about the couple.

Cast

Production 
In April 2021, soon after the finale of the cooking reality show Cooku with Comali, participant Ashwin Kumar Lakshmikanthan (who finished at third) and comedian Pugazh announced that they would be appearing in a feature film together to be directed by A. Hariharan and produced by Trident Arts. In late June, the film's title was revealed to be Enna Solla Pogirai, derived from a song from Kandukondain Kandukondain (2000), and it is the debut for Ashwin as a solo lead actor after several supporting roles. After Hariharan wrote the script and pitched it to R. Ravindran of Trident Arts, it was the latter who suggested Ashwin. Hariharan explained the relevance of the title: "This question is pertinent especially when you're waiting to hear from your lover, right?". Two separate films with the same title were earlier announced – one in 2001 and another in 2011 – but neither came to fruition. In early July, Teju Ashwini and Avantika Mishra were announced as the lead actresses. Principal photography began on 19 July in Chennai. Richard M. Nathan, the cinematographer, sought to make the film "look clean and glossy" due to its genre, and also the look of an advertisement. With regards to lighting, he said he tried to eschew shadows and contrasts, and "showcase the actors in soft light from all sides, to create a pleasant look". The second schedule began in mid September. Filming wrapped in late October.

Soundtrack 

The soundtrack is composed by Vivek–Mervin, and Muzik 247 holds the audio rights of the film's album. The majority of songs were released as singles; "Aasai" was released on 29 September 2021, "Cute Ponnu" on 20 November, and "Uruttu" on 2 December 2021. The audio launch was held on 6 December 2021, and the fourth single "It's Raining Love" was released the day after. A reprise version of "Aasai" was released on 8 December, and another single, "Neethandi", on 8 January 2022.

Release and reception 
Enna Solla Pogirai was initially scheduled to release on 24 December 2021, but later pushed to 13 January 2022, the week of Pongal. M. Suganth of The Times of India rated the film 3 stars out of 5, saying, "The lively music by Vivek-Mervin and the chic visuals by cinematographer Richard Nathan also help to keep us involved in the proceedings. And there is genuine warmth in the way the director manages to resolve the issues of the characters". Avinash Ramachandran of Cinema Express wrote, "It is not often in Tamil cinema that we get a well-made romantic musical, and in many ways, Enna Solla Pogirai hopes to fill that vacuum. While it might not necessarily be a perfect fit, it is no doubt a decent value addition to this list" and rated the film 2.5 stars out of 5.

Home media 
The film's post-theatrical streaming rights were bought by ZEE5, where it began streaming from 15 April 2022. The satellite rights were bought by Zee Tamil, where it premiered on 15 May 2022. The television premiere registered TRP ratings of 0.99.

References

External links 
 

2020s Tamil-language films
2022 films
2022 romantic comedy films
Indian romantic comedy films